Dip circles (also dip needles) are used to measure the angle between the horizon and the Earth's magnetic field (the dip angle).  They were used in surveying, mining and prospecting as well as for the demonstration and study of magnetism.

Georg Hartmann first discovered dip angle in 1544, when he noticed the needle on a compass dipped towards the north hemisphere.  Rather than explore this phenomenon, Hartmann sought ways to eliminate it. However, Robert Norman around 1576 investigated dip angle further and in 1581 described in print a device to measure this phenomenon.

Early dip circles were not accurate and gave poor results.  Over the next 300 years many improvements were made, including reducing the friction between the needle and its pivot and encasing the circle in glass.  Between the late 18th century and late 19th century the design approached its peak. Improvements which made the dip circle a practical aid for polar navigation were made by Robert Were Fox FRS, who developed in the 1830s the first dip circle that could be used on board a moving ship. Another important improvement to the instrument was developed in the 1830s by the Dublin physicist Humphrey Lloyd, who devised a way of attaching a magnetic needle at right-angles to the dip needle in order to measure the intensity of force (by seeing the extent to which the right-angle needle deflected the dip-needle).

By World War I the most advanced dip circles were being made.  With the development of electronic systems dip circles became obsolete.

See also
Magnetic dip

References

External links
The dip needle

Geomagnetism
Navigational equipment

zh:磁偏角